The Indoor Flanders meeting was an annual indoor track and field meeting which took place at the Flanders Sports Arena in Ghent, Belgium. It was one of foremost meetings on the indoor European circuit and one of nine events which hold IAAF Indoor Permit Meeting status.

First held in 1990, the competition was originally held at the Flanders Expo arena and moved to the Flanders Sports Arena in 2000. Over its history the meeting has been sponsored by Energizer, KBC Bank, and Toyota (its current sponsor). The 23rd edition in 2012 was annulled because of loss sponsorship. After taking a year off, the Flanders Indoor Meeting returns in 2013 and 2014 but was cancelled from 2015 onwards.

World records
Over the course of its history, numerous world record have been set at the Indoor Flanders Meeting.

Meeting records

Men

Women

References

External links
 2013 Official website
 2014 Official website
 Indoor Flanders Records

IAAF Indoor Permit Meetings
Athletics competitions in Belgium
Recurring events established in 1990
Sport in Flanders